George William Frewin (6 February 1907 – date of death unknown) was an English professional footballer who played as an inside forward. He made appearances in the English Football League with Wrexham.

References

1907 births
Date of death unknown
English footballers
Association football forwards
English Football League players
Fulham F.C. players
Belfast Celtic F.C. players
Wrexham A.F.C. players